The Assyrian was an Australian bred Thoroughbred racehorse owned by CS Agnew and trained by J.E. Savill that won the 1882 Melbourne Cup being ridden by C Hutchins, presumably named after the Assyrians of Mesopotamia and their ancient empires.

In the final stages of the 1882 Melbourne Cup, The Assyrian drew clear to defeat Stockwell by half a length, and send the heavily backed Gudarz into third place. The Assyrian also won the 1883 Hobart Cup, becoming the only horse to win both the Melbourne Cup and the Hobart Cup for almost 89 years until being joined by Piping Lane in 1972, with the currently two remaining alone in the achievement.

Pedigree

References

Melbourne Cup winners
1877 racehorse births
Racehorses bred in Australia
Racehorses trained in Australia
Thoroughbred family 4-b